Mount Morungole lies within the Kidepo Valley National Park, north-east Uganda, Africa. It is in the rugged, semi-arid Karamoja province near the border with the Sudan. Neighbouring peaks are Mount Zulia, and the Labwor and Dodoth Hills reach heights in excess of 2,000 meters.

The local inhabitants were the Ik, who were moved by a previous administration. They were attached to Mount Morungole considering it a sacred place.

References

Morungole